James Baumgart (born December 22, 1938) is a former member of the Wisconsin State Assembly and the Wisconsin State Senate.

He was born in Gibson, Wisconsin, United States. He graduated from Sheboygan North High School in Sheboygan, Wisconsin before attending the University of Wisconsin-Sheboygan and the University of Wisconsin-Stevens Point. Baumgart has served in the United States Army and has been active with the Boy Scouts of America and the Izaak Walton League. He is married and has one daughter from a previous marriage.

Political career
Baumgart was elected to the Senate in 1998. Previously, he had been a member of the Assembly from 1990 to 1996. He is a Democrat.

References

People from Manitowoc County, Wisconsin
Politicians from Sheboygan, Wisconsin
Democratic Party Wisconsin state senators
Military personnel from Wisconsin
United States Army soldiers
University of Wisconsin–Stevens Point alumni
1938 births
Living people
Democratic Party members of the Wisconsin State Assembly